Acronicta carbonaria is a moth of the family Noctuidae. It is found in Japan (Honshu, Shikoku and Kyushu), the Korean Peninsula and the Russian Far East (Primorye and southern Khabarovsk).

External links
Korean Insects

Acronicta
Moths of Asia
Moths described in 1889